The North Dakota Fighting Hawks men's ice hockey team (formerly The North Dakota Fighting Sioux) is the college ice hockey team at the Grand Forks campus of the University of North Dakota. They are members of the National Collegiate Hockey Conference (NCHC) and compete in National Collegiate Athletic Association (NCAA) Division I ice hockey. North Dakota is widely regarded as a premier college hockey school and has one of the most storied programs in NCAA history. UND has made over 30 appearances in the NCAA tournament, appeared in the Frozen Four 22 times, and has won 8 NCAA Division I Championships. The program has also achieved 15 WCHA Regular Season Championships, 5 NCHC Regular Season Championships, and 12 Conference Tournament Championships. The school's former nickname was the Fighting Sioux, which had a lengthy and controversial tenure before ultimately being retired by the university in 2012 due to pressure from the NCAA. The official school nickname is now the Fighting Hawks, a name that was chosen by the university on November 18, 2015.

History

Early history 
Varsity ice hockey at the University of North Dakota began in 1946 with John Jamieson as the first coach. The 1946–47 season was the first winning season in UND history with a record of 7 wins, 6 losses, and 0 ties. UND joined Michigan Tech, Colorado College, University of Denver, University of Michigan, Michigan State University, and University of Minnesota as founding members of the Midwest Collegiate Hockey League (MCHL) in 1951. In the program's first season in league play UND finished with a record of 13–11–1. After two seasons the MCHL became the Western Intercollegiate Hockey League (WIHL) and later in 1959 became the Western Collegiate Hockey Association. Artificial ice was installed in UND's Winter Sports Building, commonly known as "The Barn", in 1953.

Bob May became the 5th coach in UND history for the 1957–58 season and led the team to the 1957–58 WIHL Regular Season Championship. UND also received a bid to the 1958 NCAA Division I Men's Ice Hockey Tournament. The team advanced to the championship game with a 9–1 win over Harvard in the semi-final round. UND fell in their first championship and post season tournament appearance to University of Denver 2–6. Following the 1957–58 season the WIHL broke up, after Michigan, Michigan State, Michigan Tech, and Minnesota left the conference following a dispute over recruiting practices. Despite not violating the WIHL or the NCAA's rules of the period, the four exiting schools accused Denver, North Dakota and Colorado College of breaking a gentlemen's agreement by recruiting overage Canadians.

Thorndycraft era 
Without a conference UND competed as an independent Division I team for the 1958–59 season. Barry Thorndycraft took over for May as head coach and continued the winning tradition established in the previous season. UND again reached the NCAA Tournament for the second straight season and again advanced to the championship with a 4–3 overtime win over St. Lawrence. UND beat former WIHL member Michigan State with another 4–3 overtime victory to win the university's first ice hockey national championship. UND ended with a record of 20–10–1 on the season. 1959 marked the official founding of the Western Collegiate Hockey Association (WCHA) and after three seasons in the WCHA UND returned to the national stage for the 1963 NCAA Tournament held in Chestnut Hill, Massachusetts at the McHugh Forum. North Dakota blew away the hometown Boston College Eagles 8–2 and won the school's second ice hockey championship with a 6–5 win over rival Denver. The team finished with a record of 22–7–3 and coach Thorndycraft was named WCHA Coach of the Year for 1962–63.

Peters, Selman, Bjorkman years 
Thorndycraft left the program in 1964 and under new coach R.H. "Bob" Peters, UND won the MacNaughton Cup for the WCHA regular season championship in 1964–65. The team advanced to the 1965 NCAA Tournament but lost 3–4 in the semi-final round to Boston College. Bill Selman became coach in 1966 and led the team to their third MacNaughton Cup in history and a spot in the 1967 NCAA Tournament. UND's run ended with a loss to Cornell 0–1 but Selman received the 1966–67 WCHA Coach of the Year award. The following season UND received an at-large bid to the 1968 NCAA Tournament. North Dakota beat Cornell 4–1 in a rematch of the 1967 semi-final game. UND advanced to the National Championship game for the first time since winning it 5 seasons earlier in 1963. UND again found themselves in the National Championship game matched up with conference rival Denver, North Dakota would fall to the Pioneers 0–4. Rube Bjorkman became the 9th coach in program history after previously serving as head coach at the University of New Hampshire. Over the 10 seasons as coach UND finished with two winning seasons, one in his first season as UND coach in 1968–69 and a second in 1971–72. During his tenure as UND coach Bjorkman compiled a record of 149–186–11.

Gasparini era 
John "Gino" Gasparini was hired in 1978, Gasparini played for UND from 1964 to 1967 before a short stint in the International Hockey League then returning to UND under Bjorkman as an assistant coach. Gasparini's impact was immediate and UND finished the regular season winning the MacNaughton Cup and advancing to the 1979 NCAA Tournament. North Dakota picked up a 4–2 victory of Dartmouth in the semi-final round but fell in the national championship game to Minnesota 3–4. North Dakota finished the season with a record of 30–11–1, the program's first 30-win season, as well as Gasparini being named WCHA Coach of the Year. The 30 wins of the 1978–79 season was eclipsed the following season when North Dakota picked up 31 wins and the programs third National Championship with a 5–2 win over Northern Michigan. North Dakota returned to the NCAA Tournament in 1984. North Dakota swept Rensselaer two games to none in the quarter final round but fell 1–2 in overtime to Minnesota-Duluth

The 1986–87 season UND swept through the WCHA winning the MacNaughton Cup and WCHA Final Five Tournament. UND advanced to the 1987 NCAA Tournament sweeping St. Lawrence in two games by a combined score of 9–4 and advancing to the Championship with a 5–2 win over Harvard. North Dakota won their fifth NCAA Division I National Championship when UND defeated Michigan State Spartans in front of a Spartan crowd in Detroit, Michigan on March 28, 1987. The team would make the NCAA Tournament one more time with Gasparini behind the bench in 1990 but fell in the regional round of the expanded NCAA Tournament when the team lost to Boston University two games to one in the best of three series.

Blais era 

After four quiet years, Dean Blais took over as head coach of North Dakota after John "Gino" Gasparini in 1994. In his third season as head coach, Blais led UND to the program's eighth MacNaughton Cup for WCHA regular season champions and fifth Broadmoor Trophy for WCHA playoff champions. UND advanced to the Frozen Four after a 6–2 victory over Cornell in the quarterfinal round. UND then advanced to the National Championship with a 6–2 win over Colorado College. Under Blais, UND won 6–4 over Boston University to win the school's Six National Championship. That same season Blais was named recipient of the Spencer Penrose Award for Division I College Coach of the Year.

North Dakota returned to the NCAA Tournament in 1998 and 1999 but were plagued with early-round exits. In the 1999–2000 season, after again winning the WCHA Tournament, UND advanced through the 2000 NCAA Tournament to the Championship against Boston College, looking for its first NCAA title since 1949. BC had a 2–1 lead entering the third period, but UND responded with three goals, with two by Lee Goren. Goren tied the game, assisted on Jason Ulmer's game-winning goal, and then scored into an empty Eagles net in the last minute of play to secure the game. It marked North Dakota's seventh national title overall and second since 1997, and was also the third time in three years that BC came up short in the Frozen Four. Boston College got its revenge over UND the following season when the two teams again faced each other in the National Championship. BC won its first national title since 1949 by defeating North Dakota, 3–2, in overtime on a goal scored by sophomore forward Krys Kolanos just 4:43 into OT.

In 2001, the team moved into the new $100 million, 11,500-seat Ralph Engelstad Arena, replacing the aging 6,000-seat Old Ralph Engelstad Arena that served as the home for UND hockey since 1972. After missing the NCAA post-season tournament in 2002, UND returned in 2003. North Dakota fell to Ferris State 2–5 in the opening round of the West Regionals.  And in the 2004 NCAA Tournament, UND shut out Holy Cross 3–0 before getting shut out 0–1 in the West Regional Final to Denver.

Hakstol era 

On July 9, 2004, Dave Hakstol was announced as the 15th coach in program history, replacing Dean Blais who left UND when he was named associate coach of the Columbus Blue Jackets. Blais served as UND head coach for 10 seasons and placed first among active coaches with a record of 262–115–13 and a .733 winning percentage. With Hakstol behind the bench, UND continued their winning tradition that was prevalent under Blais. UND won 4–3 in overtime vs. Maine on October 8, 2004 to give Hakstol his first win as head coach. UND received an at-large bid to the 2005 NCAA Tournament and found themselves in the Championship against long-time rival University of Denver. DU freshman goaltender Peter Mannino backstopped an offensive attack that included a 2-goal game by DU forward Paul Stastny to hand UND a 1–4 loss.

North Dakota made and advanced in the next three NCAA Tournaments but came up with third-place finishes in the Frozen Four, losing to Boston College three seasons in a row. In 2006 losing 5–6 to the Eagles, in 2007 falling 4–6, and in 2008 losing 1–6. Despite the third consecutive loss to BC in the Frozen Four, the seasons ended on high notes in 2006–07 when sophomore forward Ryan Duncan became the second UND player to win the Hobey Baker Award and the first in 20 seasons after Tony Hrkac in 1986–87. The 2007–08 season was only the second time in UND Hockey history that North Dakota had two finalists for the Hobey Baker Award when junior forward T.J. Oshie and senior goalie Jean-Philippe Lamoureux; the other time in 2004 when Zach Parise, Brandon Bochenski were nominated.

In March 2009 UND won a WCHA-leading 14th league championship with a 2–1 win at Wisconsin. The team advanced to the 2009 NCAA Tournament but fell in the Northeast Region semifinal to New Hampshire, 5–6 in overtime, after UNH's Thomas Fortney scored with :00.1 remaining in regulation to force OT and UNH's Josh LaBlanc scored 45 seconds into overtime. UND capped off the 2009–10 regular season and won the 2010 WCHA Men's Ice Hockey Tournament to receive an automatic bid to the 2010 NCAA Tournament. UND fell in the Northeast Regional semifinals to Yale 2–3 after The Bulldogs scored 3 goals in a span of 4:57 during the second period and Yale goaltender Ryan Rondeau stopped 34 UND shots.

In March 2011 UND captured its WCHA-leading 15th league championship with an 11–2 win at Michigan Tech. The team advanced as the #1 seed into the 2011 WCHA Tournament by beating #12 seed Michigan Tech (8–0, 3–1). UND advanced to the 2011 WCHA Final Five to play Colorado College in the WCHA semi-final and won with a late 3rd period goal by Matt Frattin to advance them to the WCHA Championship. UND then faced rival Denver for the Broadmoor Trophy. Denver took to the early lead 1–0 at 5:06 of the first period, UND rallied at 2:32 of the second period and struck again at 8:18 of the second period. Denver tied it up at 17:47 of the third period to force the game into overtime. Frattin scored the game winner at 5:11 of the second overtime to claim North Dakota's 2nd as many seasons and 9th Broadmoor Trophy overall for UND. The team advanced to the 2011 NCAA Tournament Midwest Regional in Green Bay, Wisconsin. At the Midwest Regional, UND faced off first against Rensselaer Polytechnic Institute (RPI), where they shut out the Engineers, 6–0, advancing to play WCHA rival Denver for the second straight weekend. UND defeated the Pioneers of Denver 6–1 in the Midwest Regional Final to advance to their fifth Frozen Four in 8 seasons under Dave Hakstol. In the NCAA Frozen Four, UND saw their highly anticipated season come to an end with a 0–2 shutout to the Michigan Wolverines.

In March 2012, UND captured its 10th Broadmoor Trophy with a 4–0 victory over rival Denver. With this victory, UND made history by being the first team in WCHA history to capture the Broadmoor three straight years (2010, 2011, 2012); this is the second time UND has won the tournament from a play in game and also holds a 13-game unbeaten streak in the WCHA tournament and an 8-game WCHA Final Five unbeaten streak. UND lost to rival Minnesota in the NCAA tournament.

Hakstol left the team in May 2015 to take the head coaching job with the Philadelphia Flyers of the National Hockey League, becoming the first college coach to jump to an NHL head coaching position since Herb Brooks was hired by the Minnesota North Stars in 1987.

National Collegiate Hockey Conference (NCHC) 
On July 14, 2011, College Hockey Inc. announced the formation of a new hockey league, the National Collegiate Hockey Conference, which would begin play in the 2013–14 season. The league's six charter members were North Dakota, Colorado College, Denver, Miami (OH), Minnesota–Duluth, and Nebraska-Omaha. All were WCHA members except for CCHA member Miami. Two months after the announcement of the new league, the NCHC added a sixth WCHA member, St. Cloud State, and another CCHA member, Western Michigan. The NCHC has had no membership changes since starting play. The new league was made after the Big Ten Conference decided to sponsor hockey. This change caused widespread backlash due to the break-up of old rivalries that included Minnesota, North Dakota, and Wisconsin.

Berry Era (2015–present) 
After Dave Hakstol obtained the head coaching job in Philadelphia, Brad Berry received a promotion to Head Coach on May 18, 2015.  In his first year, he managed a decisive 34–6–4 record, building a line known as the CBS line (Caggiula, Boeser, Schmaltz).

In 2016, North Dakota once again won the NCHC Regular Season Championship, but were defeated in the NCHC Tournament. UND finished the regular season as the #3 ranked team in the country and qualified for the NCAA Tournament. For the third consecutive season, UND advanced to the 2016 Frozen Four, defeating Northeastern, and Michigan to get there.  Following a dramatic 4–2 win over Denver, North Dakota had reached the Championship where they defeated Quinnipiac 5–1.  This was their first championship since 2000, and their eighth overall.  Only Michigan and Denver have more championships with nine.

2017 was an up and down year that resulted in the program's 15th consecutive postseason berth. North Dakota lost in double overtime against Boston University in the NCAA tournament, after having a goal disallowed in the first overtime due to an offsides review.

In 2018, inconsistency again plagued the North Dakota hockey team. Plenty of streaks ending, most notably the run of postseason NCAA national tournament appearances. North Dakota's streak of 20 wins in a season came to an end. It resulted in missing the postseason for the first time since the 2001–2002 season.

2019 was another inconsistent year for North Dakota. It resulted in the team finishing 5th in the 8th place NCHC standings. This snapped a streak dating back to the 2002–03 season in which North Dakota hosted and ultimately advanced in their conference tournament. Their season ended with a sweep to the hands of Denver in the first round of the NCHC Playoffs.

2020 was a return to national prominence for UND. The team accomplished many feats that few North Dakota teams did before. The team won a series at rivals Denver for the first time in years by virtue of a win and a tie and swept both games against Minnesota at 3M arena at Mariucci for only the 2nd time in the previous 40-year history of games in Minneapolis. The team achieved a #1 ranking in both national polls and was PairWise #1 during the regular season for the first time since 2017. The team went on to win the Penrose Cup as regular season champions in the NCHC.

2020 Post-Season Cancellation Due to COVID-19
In March 2020, before College hockey playoffs began, the NCAA cancelled the remainder of all college sports 2020 spring season. The team was due to host Colorado College for a first round series for the start of the postseason, however, the NCHC tournament was canceled due to the outbreak of the coronavirus (COVID-19). Very soon after, the NCAA tournament was canceled leaving the season over for North Dakota. North Dakota set a home record at 18–1, the best in UND hockey history with a win percentage of .947. UND finished the year ranked #1 in the Pairwise with a record of 26-5-4.

2021-Present
In 2021, as a result of the ongoing COVID-19 pandemic, it was determined to play only league games in the NCHC. The first ten games of league play would start in a "pod" in Omaha at Baxter Arena in a three-week period to maximize opportunity to play all games in a controlled situation. North Dakota finished the pod in first in the NCHC and continued to roll into the rest of the regular season and captured their second straight Penrose Cup as regular season champions of the NCHC. The postseason tournament, instead of being played in St. Paul at the Xcel Energy Center due to restrictions from COVID-19, was selected to be played at UND's Ralph Engelstad Arena. North Dakota won the NCHC postseason tournament for the first time in their history making them the first NCHC team to win both the regular season and postseason titles in the same year. UND's promising season ended in heartbreaking fashion in the NCAA regional final round with a loss to rival Minnesota-Duluth in 5 overtimes, making it the longest game in NCAA postseason history.

2022 brought continued success in the regular season for North Dakota. They captured the Penrose Cup for a third consecutive season. They entered the postseason playing host to Colorado College in the first round of the NCHC playoffs and swept the Tigers. A loss at the Frozen Faceoff to Western Michigan ended their NCHC tournament. They would be selected to play in the NCAA tournament but lose in the first round to Notre Dame ending their season.

2023 was a disappointment to the high expectations coming into the season. Inconsistencies in their play in the early part of the year plagued their season despite playing better towards the end of the year. The team would finish tied for 5th in the NCHC standings, and ultimately bowed out in the semifinals of the NCHC tournament. The team would not be selected for participation in the NCAA tournament, which is the 3rd time in 8 years under Brad Berry they have not qualified.

Season-by-season results

Source:

Championships

NCAA Tournament Championships

WCHA Final Five playoff record
Final Five Playoffs (1988–2013) Record 64–34–0

WCHA Tournament Championships/Broadmoor Trophy

WCHA Regular Season Championships/MacNaughton Cup

NCHC Regular Season Championships/Penrose Cup

NCHC Tournament Championships

Historic record 
As of Mar 20, 2023

Records vs. Western Collegiate Hockey Association (WCHA)

Record vs. National Collegiate Hockey Conference opponents

Record vs. all active opponents

Head coaches

All-time coaching records 
As of June 1, 2022

Statistical leaders
Source:

Career points leaders

Career goaltending leaders

GP = Games played; Min = Minutes played; W = Wins; L = Losses; T = Ties; GA = Goals against; SO = Shutouts; SV% = Save percentage; GAA = Goals against average

minimum 40 games played

Statistics current through the start of the 2022–23 season.

Players

Current roster
As of August 24, 2022.

Olympians
This is a list of North Dakota alumni who have played on an Olympic team.

UND Hall of Fame
The following is a list of people associated with the men's ice hockey program who were elected into the UND Hall of Fame (induction date in parenthesis).

Bill Reichart (1975)
John Noah (1976)
Bill Steenson (1976)
Ken Johannson (1977)
Cal Marvin (1977)
Reg Morelli (1977)
Fido Purpur (1977)
Ben Cherski (1978)
Gordon Christian (1980)
Milt Johnson (1981)
Buzz Johnson (1981)
Bob May (1981)
Jim Medved (1981)
Daniel McKinnon (1982)
Bartley Larson (1983)
John Marks (1985)
Bob Munro (1985)
Ralph Engelstad (1987)
Dennis Hextall (1987)
Mike Curran (1988)
Ken Purpur (1989)
Bill Selman (1993)
Mark Taylor (1993)
Doug Smail (1995)
Terry Abram (1996)
Guy LaFrance (1997)
Al McLean (1997)
Phil Sykes (1997)
Rick Wilson (1997)
Marc Chorney (1998)
Paul Chadwick (2001)
Jim Archibald (2002)
1947–48 Men's Team (2002)
1958–59 Men's Team (2002)
Jim Archibald (2002)
Troy Murray (2003)
1962–63 Men's Team (2003)
Dave Christian (2004)
Darren Jensen (2004)
1979–80 Men's Team (2004)
Bob Joyce (2005)
1986–87 Men's Team (2005)
Alan Hangsleben (2006)
Tony Hrkac (2006)
1981–82 Men's Team (2006)
Craig Ludwig (2008)
Dixon Ward (2009)
1996–97 Men's Team (2012)
Greg Johnson (2013)
Jason Blake (2016)
Steve Johnson (2017)
Dean Blais (2018)
1999–00 Men's Team (2018)
Lee Davidson (2019)

Fighting Hawks in the NHL
As of July 1, 2022.

RyanJohnson18012009.jpg

WHA
Two players also were members of WHA teams.

Source:

Awards and honors

Hockey Hall of Fame

Ed Belfour (2011)

United States Hockey Hall of Fame
Source:

Dave Christian (2001)
Mike Curran (1998)
Cal Marvin (1982)
Fido Purpur (1974)

NCAA

Individual awards

Hobey Baker Award
Tony Hrkac: 1987
Ryan Duncan: 2007

Spencer Penrose Award
John Gasparini: 1987
Dean Blais: 1997, 2001
Brad Berry: 2020

Mike Richter Award
Zane McIntyre: 2015

NCAA Division I Ice Hockey Scoring Champion
Tony Hrkac: 1987
Steve Johnson: 1988
Jeff Panzer: 2001

Lowes' Senior CLASS Award
Jordan Kawaguchi: 2021

Tournament Most Outstanding Player

 Reg Morelli; 1959
 Al McLean; 1963
 Doug Smail; 1980
 Phil Sykes; 1982
 Tony Hrkac; 1987
 Matt Henderson; 1997
 Lee Goren; 2000
 Drake Caggiula; 2016

All-Americans
AHCA First Team All-Americans

1950-51: John Noah, D
1952-53: Ben Cherski, F
1953-54: Spike Schultz, G; Ben Cherski, F
1954-55: Bill Reichart, F
1956-57: Bill Reichart, F
1957-58: Bill Steenson, F
1958-59: Bill Steenson, F
1959-60: Reg Morelli, F
1962-63: Don Ross, D; Al McLean, F; Dave Merrifield, F
1964-65: Don Ross, D
1965-66: Terry Casey, F
1966-67: Jerry Lafond, D
1967-68: Terry Abram, D; Bob Munro, F
1968-69: John Marks, D; Bob Munro, F
1969-70: John Marks, D
1971-72: Alan Hangsleben, D
1978-79: Bob Iwabuchi, G; Kevin Maxwell, F
1979-80: Howard Walker, D; Mark Taylor, F
1980-81: Marc Chorney, D
1982-83: James Patrick, D
1983-84: Jon Casey, G
1986-87: Ian Kidd, D; Tony Hrkac, F; Bob Joyce, F
1987-88: Steve Johnson, F
1989-90: Russ Parent, D
1990-91: Greg Johnson, F
1992-93: Greg Johnson, F
1997-98: Curtis Murphy, F
1998-99: Brad Williamson, D; Jason Blake, F
1999-00: Karl Goehring, G; Jeff Panzer, F
2000-01: Travis Roche, D; Jeff Panzer, F
2003-04: Brandon Bochenski, F; Zach Parise, F
2006-07: Ryan Duncan, F; Jonathan Toews, F
2007-08: T. J. Oshie, F
2010-11: Chay Genoway, D; Matt Frattin, F
2012-13: Danny Kristo, F
2015-16: Brock Boeser, F
2016-17: Tucker Poolman, D
2019-20: Jordan Kawaguchi, F
2020-21: Shane Pinto, F
2021-22: Jake Sanderson, D

AHCA Second Team All-Americans

1949-50: Daniel McKinnon, D; Buzz Johnson, F
1956-57: Bill Steenson, F
1985-86: Scott Sandelin, D
1986-87: Ed Belfour, G
1990-91: Lee Davidson, F
1991-92: Greg Johnson, F
1995-96: Teeder Wynne, F
1996-97: Curtis Murphy, D; David Hoogsteen, F
1997-98: Karl Goehring, G; Jason Blake, F
1998-99: Jay Panzer, F
1999-00: Lee Goren, F
2000-01: Bryan Lundbohm, F
2006-07: Taylor Chorney, D
2008-09: Chay Genoway, D
2010-11: Aaron Dell, G
2012-13: Corban Knight, F
2014-15: Zane McIntyre, G
2015-16: Cam Johnson, G; Troy Stecher, D; Drake Caggiula, F
2020-21: Matt Kiersted, D; Jordan Kawaguchi, F

WCHA

Individual awards

Player of the Year
Gerry Kell, F: 1965
Phil Sykes, F: 1982
Tony Hrkac, F: 1987
Curtis Murphy, D: 1998
Jason Blake, F: 1999
Jeff Panzer, F: 2001
Ryan Duncan, F: 2007
Matt Frattin, F: 2011

Outstanding Student-Athlete of the Year
Steve Johnson, F: 1988
Mitch Vig, D: 1998
Karl Goehring, G: 2001
Chay Genoway, D: 2011
Brad Eidsness, G: 2012

Coach of the Year
Barry Thorndycraft: 1963
Bob Peters: 1965
Bill Selman: 1967
John Gasparini: 1979, 1982, 1987
Dean Blais: 1997, 1999, 2001
Dave Hakstol: 2009

Freshman/Rookie of the Year
Alan Hangsleben, D: 1972
Kevin Maxwell, F: 1979
James Patrick, D: 1982
Landon Wilson, F: 1994
Karl Goehring, G: 1998
Brandon Bochenski, F: 2002
Brady Murray, F: 2004
Danny Kristo, F: 2010

Sophomore of the Year
Bob Munro, F: 1967

Defensive Player of the Year
Matt Henderson, D: 1998
Brad Williamson, D: 1999
Chay Genoway, D: 2009

Most Valuable Player in Tournament
David Hoogsteen, LW: 1997
Lee Goren, RW: 2000
Jordan Parise, G: 2006
Evan Trupp, LW: 2010
Matt Frattin, RW: 2011
Aaron Dell, G: 2012

All-Conference Teams
First Team All-WCHA

1952–53: Ben Cherski, F
1953-54: Ben Cherski, F
1954-55: Bill Reichart, F
1955-56: Bill Reichart, F
1956–57: Bill Steenson, D; Bill Reichart, F
1957-58: Bill Steenson, D
1959-60: Reg Morelli, F
1962-63: Don Ross, D; Dave Merrifield, F
1964–65: Don Ross, D; Gerry Kell, F
1965–66: Terry Casey, F; Dennis Hextall, F
1966-67: Jerry Lafond, F
1967-68: Mike Curran, G; Terry Abram, D; Bob Munro, F
1968-69: Terry Abram, D; Bob Munro, F
1969-70: John Marks, D
1971-72: Alan Hangsleben, D; Jim Cahoon, F
1977-78: Bill Himmelright, F
1978-79: Bob Iwabuchi, G; Kevin Maxwell, F
1979-80: Howard Walker, D; Mark Taylor, F
1980-81: Marc Chorney, D
1981-82: Jon Casey, G; Phil Sykes, F
1982-83: James Patrick, D
1983-84: Jon Casey, G; Dan Brennan, F
1984-85: Jim Archibald, F
1985-86: Scott Sandelin, D
1986-87: Ed Belfour, G; Ian Kidd, D; Tony Hrkac, F; Bob Joyce, F
1987-88: Steve Johnson, F
1989-90: Russ Parent, D
1990-91: Russ Romaniuk, F; Greg Johnson, F
1991-92: Greg Johnson, F
1992-93: Greg Johnson, F
1994-95: Nick Naumenko, D
1995-96: Nick Naumenko, D; Teeder Wynne, F
1996-97: Curtis Murphy, D; Jason Blake, F; David Hoogsteen, F
1997-98: Karl Goehring, G; Curtis Murphy, D; Jason Blake, F
1998-99: Brad Williamson, D; Jason Blake, F
1999-00: Karl Goehring, D; Jeff Panzer, F
2000-01: Travis Roche, D; Jeff Panzer, F; Bryan Lundbohm, F
2003-04: Brandon Bochenski, F; Zach Parise, F
2006-07: Ryan Duncan, F
2007-08: Taylor Chorney, D; T. J. Oshie, F
2008-09: Chay Genoway, D
2010-11: Aaron Dell, G; Chay Genoway, D; Matt Frattin, F
2012-13: Danny Kristo, F

Second Team All-WCHA

1951–52: Elwood Shell, D
1952–53: Elwood Shell, D
1953-54: Spike Schultz, G
1956–57: Tom Yurkovich, G
1957-58: Jim Ridley, F
1959-60: Guy LaFrance, D
1960-61: Bill Colpitts, F
1962-63: Joe Lech, G; Al McLean, F
1964–65: Joe Lech, G; Dennis Hextall, F
1968–69: John Marks, D; Dave Kartio, F
1971-72: Rick Wilson, D
1976-77: Roger Lamoureux, F
1979-80: Marc Chorney, D; Doug Smail, F
1980-81: Troy Murray, F
1981-82: James Patrick, D; Craig Ludwig, D; Troy Murray, F
1982-83: Jon Casey, G; Dave Tippett, F
1983-84: Rick Zombo, D
1988-89: Russ Parent, D
1989-90: Jason Herter, D; Lee Davidson, F
1990-91: Jason Herter, D; Dixon Ward, F
1991-92: Dixon Ward, F
1997-98: David Hoogsteen, F
1998-99: Karl Goehring, G; Trevor Hammer, D; Jay Panzer, F; Jeff Panzer, F
1999-00: Lee Goren, F
2000-01: Ryan Bayda, F
2001-02: Ryan Bayda, F
2002-03: Brandon Bochenski, F
2003-04: Matt Jones, F
2006-07: Taylor Chorney, D; Jonathan Toews, F
2007-08: Jean-Philippe Lamoureux, G; Chay Genoway, D; Ryan Duncan, F
2008-09: Ryan Duncan, F
2009-10: Brad Eidsness, G
2012-13: Corban Knight, F

Third Team All-WCHA

1996–97: Dane Litke, F
1998–99: Lee Goren, F
1999–00: Jason Ulmer, F
2002–03: Andy Schneider, D; David Hale, D; Zach Parise, F
2003–04: Brady Murray, F
2004–05: Matt Jones, F
2005–06: Jordan Parise, G; Matt Smaby, D; Drew Stafford, F
2006–07: T. J. Oshie, F
2007–08: Robbie Bina, D
2008–09: Brad Eidsness, G
2009–10: Chay Genoway, D
2010–11: Jason Gregoire, F
2011–12: Ben Blood, D; Brock Nelson, F

All-WCHA Rookie Team

1992–93: Nick Naumenko, D
1993–94: Toby Kvalevog, G; Landon Wilson, F
1997–98: Karl Goehring, G; Trevor Hammer, D; Jeff Panzer, F
1999–00: Travis Roche, D; Ryan Bayda, F
2001–02: Brandon Bochenski, F
2002–03: Zach Parise, F
2003–04: Brady Murray, F
2004–05: Travis Zajac, F
2005–06: Brian Lee, D; T. J. Oshie, F
2008–09: Brad Eidsness, G
2009–10: Danny Kristo, F
2012–13: Rocco Grimaldi, F

NCHC

Individual awards

Player of the Year
 Shane Pinto; 2021

Rookie of the Year
 Brock Boeser; 2016
 Shane Pinto; 2020

Goaltender of the Year
 Zane McIntyre; 2015
 Adam Scheel; 2021

Forward of the Year
 Jordan Kawaguchi; 2020
 Shane Pinto; 2021

Defensive Forward of the Year
 Mark MacMillan; 2015
 Rhett Gardner; 2018
 Shane Pinto; 2021
 Connor Ford; 2022

Defensive Defenseman of the Year
 Tucker Poolman; 2017
 Colton Poolman; 2020
 Jacob Bernard-Docker; 2021
 Ethan Frisch; 2022

Scholar-Athlete of the Year
 Nick Mattson; 2015

Sportsmanship Award
 Matt Hrynkiw; 2017
 Mark Senden; 2022

Herb Brooks Coach of the Year
 Dave Hakstol; 2015
 Brad Berry; 2016, 2020, 2021, 2022

Frozen Faceoff MVP
 Riese Gaber; 2021

All-Conference Teams
First Team All-NCHC

 2013–14: Dillon Simpson, D
 2014–15: Zane McIntyre, G; Mark MacMillan, F
 2015–16: Brock Boeser, F; Drake Caggiula, F
 2016–17: Tucker Poolman, D
 2019–20: Jordan Kawaguchi, F
 2020–21: Adam Scheel, G; Matt Kiersted, D; Shane Pinto, F; Jordan Kawaguchi, F
 2021–22: Riese Gaber, F

Second Team All-NCHC

 2013–14: Jordan Schmaltz, D; Michael Parks, F
 2014–15: Jordan Schmaltz, D; Drake Caggiula, F
 2015–16: Cam Johnson, G; Troy Stecher, D
 2017–18: Christian Wolanin, D
 2019–20: Matt Kiersted, D
 2020–21: Jacob Bernard-Docker, D
 2021–22: Zach Driscoll, G; Jake Sanderson, D

NCHC All-Rookie Team

 2013–14: Paul LaDue, D
 2014–15: Nick Schmaltz, F
 2015–16: Brock Boeser, F
 2016–17: Tyson Jost, F
 2017–18: Grant Mismash, F
 2018–19: Adam Scheel, D
 2019–20: Shane Pinto, F
 2020–21: Jake Sanderson, D
 2021–22: Jakob Hellsten, G; Matteo Costantini, F

In-season tournaments records
Badger Showdown 6 games: 4–2–0
Great Lakes Invitational 8 games: 5–3–0
Ice Breaker Invitational 6 games: 1–4–1
Lefty McFadden Invitational 2 games: 1–1–0
Pepsi Cola Tournament 2 games: 2–0–0 
Kendell Hockey Classic 5 games: 4–0–1
Rensselaer Holiday Tournament 5 games: 4–1–0
Shillelagh Tournament 2 games: 1–1–0

Arenas
Winter Sports Building (The Old Barn)  1946–1972
Old Ralph Engelstad Arena 1972–2001 (Host of the 1983 NCAA Frozen Four)
Ralph Engelstad Arena 2001–present (Host of the 2006 NCAA West Regional and Host of the 2011 Icebreaker Invitational)

Program records

Career
Most games played in a career: Chris Porter, 175, (2003–2007) and Ryan Duncan, 175, (2005–2009)
Most goals in a career: Ben Cherski, 131, (1951–1955)
Most assists in a career: Greg Johnson, 198, (1989–1993)
Most points in a career: Greg Johnson, 272, (1989–1993)
Best career points per game (min. 75 games played): Tony Hrkac, 2.02 PPG (1984–1985, 1986–1987)
Most career power play goals: Mark Taylor, 43, (1976–1980)
Most career shorthanded goals: Russ Romaniuk, 12, (1988–1991)
Most career game winning goals: Mark Taylor, 18, (1976–1980)
Most penalty minutes in a career: Jim Archibald, 540, (1981–1985)
Most points in a career, defenseman: Bill Himmelright, 149, (1975–1979)
Most goals in a career, defenseman: Nick Naumenko, 38, (1992–1996)
Most assists in a career, defenseman: Bill Himmelright, 121, (1975–1979)
Most wins in a career: Karl Goehring, 80, (1997–2001)
Most shutouts in a career: Karl Goehring, 15, (1997–2001)
Best win percentage in a career: Karl Goehring, .765, (1997–2001)
Best goals against average in a career: Zane McIntyre, 2.10, (2012–2015)
Best save percentage in a career: Zane McIntyre, .926, (2012–2015)

Season

Players
Most goals in a season: Bob Joyce, 52, (1986–1987)
Most assists in a season: Tony Hrkac, 70, (1986–1987)
Most points in a season: Tony Hrkac, 116, (1986–1987)
Best points per game in a season (min. 20 games): Tony Hrkac, 2.42, (1986–1987)
Most power play goals in a season: Ryan Duncan, 17, (2006–2007) and Doug Smail, 17, (1979–1980)
Most shorthanded goals in a season: Tony Hrkac, 8, (1986–1987) and Doug Smail, 8, (1979–1980)
Most game winning goals in a season: T.J. Oshie, 9, (2005–2006)
Most penalty minutes in a season: Jim Archibald, 197, (1984–85)
Most points in a season, defenseman: Ian Kidd, 60, (1986–1987)
Most goals in a season, defenseman: Nick Naumenko, 13, (1994–1995) and Ian Kidd, 13, (1986–1987) and John Noah, 13, (1947–1948)
Most assists in a season, defenseman: Russ Parent, 50, (1989–1990)
Most wins in a season: Aaron Dell, 30, (2010–2011)
Most shutouts in a season: Karl Goehring, 8, (1999–2000)
Best goals against average in a season: Bob Peters, 1.27, (1957–1958)
Best save percentage in a season: Jean-Philippe Lamoureux, .932, (2007–2008)

Team
Most wins in a season: 40 (40–8–0 in 1986–1987)
Fewest losses in a season: 5 (11–5–0 in 1947–1948 and 15–5–0 in 1952–1953)
Most home wins in a season: 26 (26–2–0 in 1986–1987)
Fewest home losses in a season: 0 (14–0–3 in 1962–1963)
Most road wins in a season: 13 (13–3–3 in 2000–2001 and 13–3–1 in 2015–2016)
Fewest road losses in a season: 1 (7–1–0 in 1949–1950)
Most neutral site wins in a season: 8 (8–0–0 in 1999–2000)
Most overtime games in a season: 15 (2017–2018)
Most overtime wins in a season: 4 (1980–1981)
Longest overall unbeaten streak: 16 (2002–2003)
Most goals in a season: 264 (1986–1987)
Most assists in a season: 418 (1986–1987)
Most points in a season: 682 (1986–1987)
Most power play goals in a season: 71 (1989–1990)
Best power play percentage in a season: .302 (1977–1978)
Most shorthanded goals in a season: 18 (1986–1987)
Best penalty kill percentage in a season: .872 (2003–2004)
Most shutouts in a season: 9 (1999–2000)

Game

Player
Most goals in a game: Bill Sullivan, 8, (vs North Dakota State, 2/27/1948)
Most assists in a game: Bill Himmelright, 6, (vs Colorado College, 2/19/1977) and Doug Smail, 6, (vs Michigan State 11/5/1977)
Most points in a game: Bill Reichart, 9, (vs Minnesota-Duluth, 12/29/1954) and Bob Joyce, 9, (vs Michigan Tech 1/2/87)
Most power play goals in a game: Mark Taylor, 3, (vs Michigan State 11/23/1979) and Jeff McLean, 3, (vs Denver 10/18/1991)
Most penalty minutes in a game: Landon Wilson, 33, (vs Minnesota Duluth, 1/27/1995)
Most saves in a game: Darren Jensen, 56, (vs Minnesota, 11/31/1981)

Team
Most goals in a game: 18 (at Denver, 2/1/1950)
Most assists in a game: 24 (vs. Yale, 1/1/1960)
Most points in a game: 39 (vs. Yale, 1/1/1960)
Most power play goals in a game: 7 (at Denver, 10/18/1991)
Most shorthanded goals in a game: 3 (vs Michigan Tech, 2/16/1990)
Most penalty minutes in a game: 124 (vs Minnesota Duluth, 10/31/1998)
Largest margin of victory: 15 (vs. Yale, 15–0 on 1/1/1960)
Fastest 2 goals scored in a game: 0:02 (at Colorado College 1/30/1960)
Fastest 3 goals scored in a game: 0:20 (vs Colorado College 2/11/1953)
Fastest 4 goals scored in a game: 1:18 (vs University of Saskatchewan 12/30/76)
Longest game: 142:13 (vs Minnesota Duluth, 2-3 5OT Loss on 3/27/2021)

Period

Player
Most goals in a period: Cary Eades, 4, (vs Colorado College 11/14/1980)
Most points in a period: Milton "Prince" Johnson, 6, (vs Michigan State 2/10/1950)
Most saves in a period: Dave Murphy, 25, (vs US Olympic Team 11/07/1971)

Team
Most goals in a period: 11 (vs Manitoba, 12/28/1978)
Most assists in a period: 18 (vs Manitoba, 12/28/1978)
Most points in a period: 29 (vs Manitoba, 12/28/1978)
Most penalty minutes in a period: 70 (vs Minnesota Duluth, 10/31/1998)

Streaks

Player
Longest goal scoring streak: Ben Cherski and Gordon Christian, 12 games
Longest point scoring streak: Steve Johnson, 27 games

Team
Most consecutive winning seasons: 16 (2002–2003 to present)
Longest win streak: 15 (1979–1981)
Longest home win streak: 18 (1979–1980)
Longest road win streak: 8 (1967–1968)
Longest conference win streak: 14 (WCHA, 1986–1987)
Longest unbeaten streak: 16 (13–0–3 in 2002–2003)
Longest conference unbeaten streak: 19 (18–0–1 in 1998–1999)
Most consecutive shutouts: 4 (1953–1954 all vs Michigan Tech, 2015–2016 vs Denver, Minnesota-Duluth (2), and Alabama Huntsville)

See also 
 North Dakota Fighting Hawks women's ice hockey

References

External links
UND Men's Hockey website
SiouxSports.com – independent fansite with message boards

 
Ice hockey teams in North Dakota
1929 establishments in North Dakota
Ice hockey clubs established in 1929
Und hockey is the best hockey #sioux